Shinryaku may refer to:

Shinryaku! Ika Musume
a vehicle in the arcade game SOS